Vijay Chandra Mishra (born 4 May 1945) is an academic, author and cultural theorist from Fiji. He is currently a professor at Murdoch University, Australia.

Academic and professional career 
Born in Suva, Fiji on 4 May 1945 to Hari Mishra and Lila Mishra, Vijay was educated at Lelean Memorial School where he completed his Senior Cambridge Higher School Certificate in the First Division. Following this he did his New Zealand University Entrance Examination at Suva Grammar School where he won both the Arts and the History Prize. A British colonial scholarship took him to Victoria University of Wellington and to Christchurch Teachers’ College from which institutions he gained, respectively, a B.A. and a Diploma in Teaching.

After a brief teaching stint at Labasa College in Fiji from 1968 to 1969, Vijay went to Macquarie University on a Commonwealth Scholarship where he completed Masters papers in Linguistics and a B.A. with First Class Honours in English Literature. A further brief career in Fiji, this time as a Senior Education Officer, was followed by migration to Australia in 1974. By then he was married to Nalini Singh, daughter of Pratap and Damiyanti Singh.

In Australia he completed a Masters in English literature at Sydney University and then, in 1976, joined the newly established Murdoch University in Perth, as a tutor in World Literature. He left the university in early 1978 to undertake a PhD in Medieval Indian Poetry and Aesthetics at the Australian National University which he gained in 1981.

He returned to Murdoch University as a lecturer in Comparative Literature but three years later left for Oxford University to complete his DPhil in English Literature, graduating in 1989. After holding the position of professor of English Literature at the University of Alberta in Canada, Mishra has been the professor of English and Comparative Literature at Murdoch University since 1999. Between 2010 and 2015 he was an Australian Research Council Professorial Fellow. He has also held visiting professorships at the University of Wales, the University of California, the University of Otago, Universitat des Saarlandes., University of Technology, Sydney, and the Australian National University. In 2015, he was the Erich Auerbach Professor of Global Literature at the University of Tübingen. For the period of 2017-2019, he was elected Visiting Fellow, University of Tulsa to work in the V. S. Naipaul Archive deposited in the university's McFarlin Library.

Selected bibliography

Books

Articles

Citations and review 
Vijay Mishra is a multidisciplinary scholar whose works are cited by scholars working in film studies, classical Indian studies, literary and cultural theories, religious studies, English literature including post colonial, diaspora and Australian literatures. His books have been reviewed and critically acclaimed by scholars worldwide

Awards and honors 
 Raja Rao Award for Literature, Samvad Foundation, New Delhi (2008)
 Fellow of Australian Academy of the Humanities (2009)
 Christensen Professorial Fellow of St Catherine's College, Oxford University (Hilary Term, 2013)

References

1945 births
Living people
Academic staff of Murdoch University
People educated at Lelean Memorial School
Victoria University of Wellington alumni
Macquarie University alumni
Australian National University alumni
Academic staff of the University of Alberta
Alumni of the University of Oxford
People from Suva